Khirbet al-Deir, or Khirbet ed-Deir, is a Palestinian village located  southwest of Bethlehem, and  northwest of Hebron. The town is in the Hebron Governorate of central West Bank. According to the 2007 Palestinian Central Bureau of Statistics (PCBS) Census, the village had a population of 264 people.

History

Late Ottoman period: the village
The village was built at the site of an old monastery in the early 18th century, by residents who broke away from Surif.

British Mandate period
At the time of the 1931 census of Palestine, conducted by the British Mandate authorities, the population of Kh. ed Dair was counted under Dura.

Jordanian period
After the 1948 Arab-Israeli War, the area was under Jordanian rule.

The Jordanian census of 1961 found 133 inhabitants in Kh[irbet] Deir.

1967-present
Since the Six-Day War in 1967, the town has been under Israeli occupation.

The only institution in the village is the Village Council. The population in the 1967 census conducted by the Israeli authorities was 301. 

In 2004, Israel started constructing the West Bank barrier near the village; 1500 meters of which pass through village land. 500 dunams of village land have been lost due to the wall; including 400 dunams now isolated behind the wall.

According to statistics provided by ARIJ, in 2009, some 40% of the village's population worked in Israel, being issued permits to work on the Israeli side of the Green Line. The villagers are all Muslims.

Footnotes

Bibliography

Applied Research Institute–Jerusalem (ARIJ). Khirbet Ad Deir Village: Fact Sheet
ARIJ. Khirbet Ad Deir: Village Profile

External links
Palestine Remembered, Welcome To Kh. al-Dayr
ARIJ. Aerial photo
ARIJ. The priorities and needs for development in Khirbet ad Deir village based on the community and local authorities' assessment
Survey of Western Palestine, Map 21: IAA, Wikimedia commons

Villages in the West Bank
Hebron Governorate
Municipalities of the State of Palestine